Kenansville is the name of two communities in the United States:
Kenansville, North Carolina
Kenansville, Florida